Blaise Kouassi may refer to:

 Blaise Kouassi (footballer, born 1975), former Ivorian football defender
 Blaise Kouassi (footballer, born 1983), Ivorian footballer